This list of people in Playboy 1990–99 is a catalog of women and men who appeared in Playboy magazine in the years 1990 through 1999. Note that not all of the people featured in the magazine are pictured in the nude.

Entries in blue indicate that the issue marks the original appearance of that year's Playmate of the Year (PMOY).

1990

1991

1992

1993

1994

1995

1996

1997

1998

1999

See also
List of people in Playboy 1953–1959
List of people in Playboy 1960–1969
List of people in Playboy 1970–1979
List of people in Playboy 1980–1989
List of people in Playboy 2000–2009
List of people in Playboy 2010–2020

References

People in Playboy 1990–1999
Lists of 20th-century people
1990s Playboy Playmates
1990s in mass media
1990s-related lists
Playboy